Paolo Zampolli (born March 5, 1970) is an Italian-born New York City-based businessman. Zampolli is the Ambassador, Permanent Mission of Dominica to the United Nations.

Early life
Paolo Zampolli is an only child of a Milanese family.

ID Models
In the mid 1990s, Paolo Zampolli founded ID Models in New York City. He went on to form a partnership with the Trump Organization as Director of International Development.

Real estate
While transitioning from the world of fashion to real estate, Zampolli as co-chairman of the Paramount Group, used fashion models to sell properties in Manhattan.
The New York office was located on the ground floor of 104 Greene Street in the heart of SoHo, and used primarily models from his modeling agency, ID Models, also located in New York City.

United Nations
Zampolli has worked with several United Nations environmental projects, including hosting functions such as the United Nations Diamond Awards Gala for Renewable Energy and The Friends of Climate Change. Zampolli has served as President of Green Incorporated, a firm that collaborates with the United Nations on ecological projects.

As executive director of the International Renewable Energy Organization (I.R.E.O.), an intergovernmental organization, he has collaborated with the United Nations to organize various conferences on climate change. Zampolli hosted Climate Change I.R.E.O. conference which counted former U.S. President Bill Clinton as guest speaker.

In 2011, he was officially named Minister-Counsellor to the Permanent Mission of the Commonwealth of Dominica at the United Nations. In October 2013, The Prime Minister Roosevelt Skerrit appointed Zampolli as United Nation Ambassador and Ambassador For Oceans and Seas for the Commonwealth of Dominica. In June 2014, Keith Mitchell Prime Minister of Grenada, appointed Amanda Ungaro as United Nations ambassador in charge of Post 15th Agendas and responsible of the second committee with United Nations Ambassador Ranking. Ungaro is currently working under the 69th United Nations Vice President of the UN General Assembly for the Blue Economy.

John F. Kennedy Center for the Performing Arts
On December 22, 2020, Mr. Zampolli was announced as an appointee Member of the Board of Trustees of the John F. Kennedy Center for the Performing Arts by President Donald Trump.

President’s Council on Sports, Fitness & Nutrition
In January 2021, Zampolli was appointed to the President's Council on Sports, Fitness & Nutrition, joining prominent members such as: Herschel Walker, Bill Belichick, Johnny Damon, Natalie Gulbis, Misty May-Treanor, Urban Meyer, and Mariano Rivera. The council's stated purpose is to increase sports participation among youth of all backgrounds and abilities and to promote healthy and active lifestyles for all Americans.

Personal life
Zampolli is in a on-and-off relationship with Brazilian model Amanda Ungaro. They have a son together, Giovanni Zampolli.

References 

Italian emigrants to the United States
Businesspeople from Milan
Businesspeople from New York City
1970 births
Living people
Grenadian diplomats
Dominica diplomats